The 1959–60 Detroit Red Wings season saw the Red Wings finish in fourth place in the National Hockey League (NHL) with a record of 26 wins, 29 losses, and 15 ties for 67 points. They lost in the Semi-finals to the Toronto Maple Leafs, four games to two.

Regular season

Final standings

Record vs. opponents

Schedule and results

Playoffs

Player statistics

Regular season
Scoring

Goaltending

Playoffs
Scoring

Goaltending

Note: GP = Games played; G = Goals; A = Assists; Pts = Points; +/- = Plus-minus PIM = Penalty minutes; PPG = Power-play goals; SHG = Short-handed goals; GWG = Game-winning goals;
      MIN = Minutes played; W = Wins; L = Losses; T = Ties; GA = Goals against; GAA = Goals-against average;  SO = Shutouts;

Awards and records
Gordie Howe, Hart Memorial Trophy
Gordie Howe, Right Wing, NHL First All-Star Team
Marcel Pronovost, Defence, NHL First All-Star Team

References

Detroit
Detroit
Detroit Red Wings seasons
Detroit Red Wings
Detroit Red wings